Koning Willem II Stadion is a multi-purpose stadium in Tilburg, Netherlands, and the home ground of Willem II Tilburg.  It is currently used mostly for football matches. The stadium is able to hold 14,700 people, was built in 1995 and renovated in 2000 to add business lodges, a restaurant, conference rooms, business club and a supporters bar to the main building.

The new stadium is built on the same spot as the old stadium, the Gemeentelijk Sportpark Tilburg, which had a smaller capacity and fewer facilities. This stadium was demolished in 1992. The current stadium opened in 1995. Tenants Willem II Tilburg have been tenants of the stadium since 1995.

The original name was Willem II Stadion, but in 2009 the stadium was renamed Koning ("King") Willem II Stadion, honoring William II of the Netherlands.

References

Football venues in the Netherlands
Willem II (football club)
Sports venues in North Brabant
Multi-purpose stadiums in the Netherlands
Sports venues completed in 1995
UEFA Women's Euro 2017 venues
Buildings and structures in Tilburg
Sport in Tilburg